Franklin Square may refer to:

Australia 
Franklin Square (Hobart), in Hobart, Tasmania, Australia

United States 
Franklin Square (Bloomington, Illinois), listed on the NRHP in McLean County, Illinois
Franklin Square Historic District (Baltimore, Maryland), a park in Baltimore, Maryland
Franklin Square Hospital Center, a hospital in Rossville, Maryland
Franklin and Blackstone Squares in Boston, Massachusetts
Franklin Place in Boston, Massachusetts
Franklin Square (Manhattan), a former square in Lower Manhattan, demolished in 1950
Franklin Square, New York, a hamlet in Nassau County, New York
Franklin Square, Ohio, an unincorporated community
Franklin Square (Savannah, Georgia)
Franklin Square, Syracuse, a neighborhood and square in Syracuse, New York
Franklin Square (Philadelphia), one of the five main squares in Philadelphia, Pennsylvania
Franklin Square (PATCO station), a closed train station in Philadelphia, Pennsylvania
Franklin Square (Washington, D.C.)
Franklin Square (IRT Third Avenue Line), a station on the IRT Third Avenue Line in New York City

See also
Franklin Square Historic District (disambiguation)